The Men's 100m Freestyle event at the 2003 Pan American Games took place on August 14, 2003 (Day 13 of the Games).

Medalists

Records

Results

References

2003 Pan American Games Results: Day 13, CBC online; retrieved 2009-06-13.
usaswimming
swimnews
swimmers-world

Freestyle, 100m